Fakel (Факел, Russian for torch) may refer to:

 Fakel (journal), a Soviet literary journal
 Fakel Novy Urengoy, a Russian volleyball club
 FC Fakel Varva, a Ukrainian football club based in Varva
 FC Fakel Voronezh, a Russian football club based in Voronezh
 HK Fakel Bogdanovich, a Russian bandy club based in Bogdanovich
 MKB Fakel, a Russian government-owned aerospace defense corporation
 OKB Fakel, a Russian electric propulsion system development company